Sir Hugh Bisset was a 13th-14th century nobleman.

After the defeat of the forces and death of Alexander Og MacDonald, Lord of Islay in 1299 against the forces of Alexander MacDougall, Lord of Argyll, an expedition led by Angus Og MacDonald, John MacSween and Hugh was undertaken against the Lord of Argyll shortly afterwards. During the early years of the Wars of Scottish Independence, Hugh entered into the service of King Edward I of England. Intending to join the Scottish forces in 1298, Hugh landed upon the Isle of Arran with a large force. After learning of the Scottish army's defeat at the battle of Falkirk, he offered fealty to Edward I and was granted the Isle of Arran. He led a fleet of ships of the North Channel with John of Argyll during the winter of 1306. Hugh was ordered to join the Admirals of the Fleet, John de Botetourt and Simon Montagu to search for the fugitive King Robert I of Scotland in January 1307.  Hugh appears to have changed sides between England and Scotland when it suited. Hugh lost lands in Ireland for his betrayal against Edward I and later King Edward II of England.

Hugh opposed Edward Bruce's invasion of Ireland in 1315 and was involved in a battle on 1 November 1316 where 300 Scots were killed. Hugh was granted the barony of Glenarm in 1338.

Citations

References
.\

13th-century Irish people
14th-century Irish people
Clan Bissett